Mount Palombo is a mountain (1,030 m) marking the northeast end of the Mackay Mountains, in the Ford Ranges of Marie Byrd Land. Mapped by United States Antarctic Service (USAS) (1939–41) and by United States Geological Survey (USGS) from surveys and U.S. Navy air photos (1959–65). 

It was named by the Advisory Committee on Antarctic Names (US-ACAN) after Lieutenant Robert A. Palombo, U.S. Navy, who was the aircraft commander during Operation Deep Freeze 1968.

Mountains of Marie Byrd Land